The 2012 Segunda División was the 67th edition of the second tier of Federación Peruana de Futbol. The tournament was played on a home-and-away round-robin basis.

The clubs Alianza Atlético, CNI and Universidad San Marcos withdrew before the start of the season, and were replaced by Alianza Universidad and Los Caimanes.

The clubs Alianza Unicachi and Hijos de Acosvinchos were disabled and relegated to the Copa Perú for outstanding debts with the SAFAP.

Teams

League table

Results

Top goalscorers

12 goals
 Jesús Reyes (Alianza Universidad)
11 goals
 Fabricio Lenci (Sport Áncash)
10 goals
 Janio Posito (Los Caimanes)
8 goals
 Juan Montenegro (Pacifico)
7 goals
 Alexander Salas (Minero)

References

External links
 RSSSF

2
2012
Peru